ABC Central Victoria (call sign: 3ABCRR) is an ABC Local Radio station based in Bendigo, Victoria. The station opened in January 1993 and covers Bendigo, Echuca, St Arnaud and Kyneton.

The station's local programming includes a breakfast show presented by Jonathan Ridnell on weekdays and Megan Spencer on Saturdays, and a weekday morning program hosted by Fiona Parker (also heard on ABC Western Victoria and ABC Mildura Swan Hill).

References

See also
List of radio stations in Australia

Central Victoria
Radio stations in Bendigo
Bendigo